Tayside Children's Hospital is a children's facility which is attached to Ninewells Hospital in Dundee, Scotland. It delivers services to children who live in Dundee, Angus, Perth and Kinross and north east Fife and is managed by NHS Tayside.

History
The idea of a children's hospital in Dundee had been considered since 1995. Approval for the facility to be built was given in 1999 and the development proceeded in two stages: the first phase involved a series of laboratories and second phase included family friendly accommodation for parents. The new facility was formally opened by television celebrity Fred MacAulay on 7 June 2006.

Services
In the facility is a 40-bed children's medical ward which includes a six-bed High Dependency Unit and the Paediatric Assessment Unit. An outdoor play area and a large indoor play centre is run by staff. Close to the children's wards is the Ronald McDonald suites for parents to reside in while their child is in hospital.

Tayside Children's Hospital also extends beyond the Ninewells site with the Children's Ambulatory Care Unit located at Perth Royal Infirmary.

References

External links
 NHS Tayside

Hospital buildings completed in 2006
Hospitals in Dundee
Children's hospitals in the United Kingdom
NHS Scotland hospitals
Teaching hospitals in Scotland
Hospitals established in 2006
2006 establishments in Scotland
Childhood in Scotland